WADC may refer to:
 Western Australian Development Corporation, a historical Western Australian government entity
 Wright Air Development Center, a forerunner of today's Aeronautical Systems Center, part of the U.S. Air Force
World Anti-Doping Code, a document of the World Anti-Doping Agency
Wide-area damping control, a class of automatic control systems
WARF, a radio station in Akron, Ohio, which held the call sign WADC from 1925 to 1965
WLYQ, a radio station in Parkersburg, West Virginia, which held the call sign WADC from 1954 to 2018
Washington, D.C. from an abbreviation of Washington and DC